The Basilicata regional election of 2013 took place on 17–18 November 2013.

A snap election was called upon the resignation of the incumbent President, Vito De Filippo of the Democratic Party (PD), on 24 April 2013 and the subsequent dissolution of the Regional Council. Several regional ministers and councillors had been involved in an expenses scandal (and one minister and two councillors had been arrested).

Basilicata is a traditional stronghold of the PD, thus Marcello Pittella (a former Socialist and brother of Gianni Pittella, Vice President of the European Parliament) was elected President by a landslide 59.6% of the vote. Its main opponent, Tito Di Maggio of Civic Choice (supported by the whole centre-right, comprising The People of Freedom and the Union of the Centre), gained a mere 19.4%. The PD was the most voted party with 24.8%, followed by Pittella's personal list with 16.0%.

Parties and candidate

Results

Voter turnout

References

Elections in Basilicata
2013 elections in Italy